Aušrinė is a Lithuanian feminine given name. People bearing the name Aušrinė include:
Aušrinė Armonaitė (born 1989), Lithuanian politician
Aušrinė Norkienė (born 1975), Lithuanian politician 
Aušrinė Trebaitė (born 1988), Lithuanian racing cyclist

References

Lithuanian feminine given names